Aloysius (Alessandro Luigi) Gottifredi (3 May 1595 – 12 March 1652) was an Italian Jesuit, elected the ninth Superior-General of the Society of Jesus. His term of less than two months is the shortest of anyone to hold the office.

Father Gottifredi died at the house of the professed Fathers, Rome, within two months of his election, and before the Fathers assembled in General Congregation for the election had concluded their labour. This makes of General Congregation X the only one to have elected two Superiors General, as the same group of Electors proceeded, after the death of Gottifredi, to elect his successor, Goswin Nickel.

Gottifredi had been a professor of Theology and Rector of the Roman College, and later secretary of the Society under Father Mutius Vitelleschi.

References 
 

1595 births
1652 deaths
Superiors General of the Society of Jesus
17th-century Italian Jesuits